Christine Elaine Soteros is a Canadian applied mathematician. She is professor and acting head of the department of mathematics and statistics at the University of Saskatchewan, and site director of the Pacific Institute for the Mathematical Sciences for their Saskatchewan site. Her research involves the folding and packing behavior of DNA, proteins, and other string-like biomolecules, and the knot theory of random space curves.

Soteros graduated from the University of Windsor in 1980.
She completed her Ph.D. in chemical engineering at Princeton University in 1988. Her dissertation, Studies of Metal Hydride Phase Transitions Using the Cluster Variation Method, was supervised by Carol K. Hall. After postdoctoral research at the University of Toronto, working with Stuart Whittington and De Witt Sumners, she became a faculty member at the University of Saskatchewan in 1989.

References

External links
Home page

Canadian mathematicians
Women mathematicians
University of Windsor alumni
Princeton University alumni
Academic staff of the University of Saskatchewan
Year of birth missing (living people)
Living people